Dvir, also known as Dvira, is a kibbutz in southern Israel. Located near Rahat and Beersheba, it falls under the jurisdiction of Bnei Shimon Regional Council.

History
The kibbutz was established in 1951 by Hashomer Hatzair members from Hungary and took its name from the Biblical city of Dvir (Joshua 21:15) that was located in the area. The original residents were joined by immigrants from South America.

A member of the kibbutz, Yitzhak Mintz, developed the QText word processing program in 1988 which was one of the first to handle the Hebrew language.

References

External links
Official website
Dvir Negev Information Centre

Kibbutzim
Kibbutz Movement
Populated places established in 1951
Populated places in Southern District (Israel)
1951 establishments in Israel
Hungarian-Jewish culture in Israel